The C.A. Rownd Round Barn is a historic building located in Cedar Falls, Iowa, United States. It was built in 1911 by C.A. Rownd. It is constructed of ashlar-faced blocks that Rownd manufactured on the site. The barn was featured in the April 1912 edition of The Farm Cement News, which was published by Universal Portland Cement. The building is a true round barn that measures  in diameter. It has been listed on the National Register of Historic Places since 1986.

References

Barns on the National Register of Historic Places in Iowa
Buildings and structures completed in 1911
Buildings and structures in Cedar Falls, Iowa
National Register of Historic Places in Black Hawk County, Iowa
Round barns in Iowa